Shangnan Road is a station on Line 6 of the Shanghai Metro. It began services on December 29, 2007.

References 

Railway stations in Shanghai
Shanghai Metro stations in Pudong
Railway stations in China opened in 2007
Line 6, Shanghai Metro